Vesalius College, also known commonly as VeCo, is a college situated in the heart of Brussels, Belgium. The college is operated in association with the Vrije Universiteit Brussel. It is named after Andreas Vesalius, one of the first and foremost pioneers in the study of Anatomy who lived during the Renaissance period.

The college was founded in 1987 and offers three-year Bachelor's degree programs in accordance with the Bologna process. Vesalius College is one of the few educational institutions in Belgium which teaches exclusively in English.

Location

The college has its own administration buildings, lecture rooms and other offices located at Pleinlaan 5 in the Brussels borough of Ixelles, adjacent to the main Etterbeek campus of the Vrije Universiteit Brussel. It also operates in cooperation with the Vrije Universiteit Brussel, using some of its classrooms for lectures.

Facilities

On the Pleinlaan campus, Vesalius College has its administrative offices, classrooms, a conference room, computer facilities as well as the Student Lounge and the English and Math Workspace. Vesalius College also shares the facilities of the adjacent campus of the Vrije Universiteit Brussel, such as classrooms, the large lecture halls (Aula), computer facilities, the library, the cafeteria, the sports complex with indoor basketball, tennis and squash courts, and gymnasium facilities.

Organisation
The College programmes fall under the auspices of Sven Van Kerckhoven, PhD.

Vesalius College has four Undergraduate Majors under the current three-year program:

Business Major - Faculty chaired by Frank Billingsley, PhD
Communications Major - Faculty chaired by Trisha Meyer, PhD
International Affairs Major - Faculty chaired by Tongfi Kim, PhD
International and European law Major Faculty chaired by Marc Cogen, PhD

There are also two MA programmes and a Master preparatory programme:

 MA in Diplomacy and Global Governance (90 or 120 ECTS option)
 MA in Global Peace, Security and Strategic Studies (90 or 120 ECTS option)

European Peace and Security Studies
The International Affairs curriculum also includes the Undergraduate Certificate in European Peace and Security Studies (EPSS). Taught jointly by Vesalius College, the Belgian Royal Military Academy, the Institute for European Studies (IES) and the University of Kent, the course critically assesses the responses of NATO, the EU and the United Nations.

All three majors are accredited by the Dutch-Flemish Accreditation Organisation (Nederlands-Vlaamse Accreditatie Organisatie, NVAO), the official accreditation agency established by international treaty between the Dutch government and the Flemish community government, which is responsible for education in (Flanders), the Dutch-speaking part of Belgium.

Internships
Students have the option of applying to participate in the Vesalius Internship Programme (VIP). The VIP is a competitive, graded internship programme that gives students the opportunity to experience an international and professional environment in the ‘Capital of Europe’. Internships are available with governmental organisations, multinational corporations, NGOs, think tanks, media centers and many other organizations.

Student organisations
The student body elects a Student Government every academic year starting in the Fall until the end of Spring. The Vesalius Student Government (VSG) includes four  members: a president, vice-president and treasurer, an internal affairs representative, an external affairs representative and a social affairs representative.  Students are asked to represent their Majors on the Student Council in which issues regarding the College and all things academic are discussed and the necessary votes are taken. These people are named Major Representatives at the beginning of every academic year.

Clubs
The College also hosts a variety of clubs in which the students can participate:
Music Club
Sports Club

Partner Institutions

At present, the College has agreements of varying types with the following colleges, universities and study abroad organizations:

The American University, Washington, D.C., United States of America
Bentley College, Waltham, Massachusetts, United States of America
Brethren Colleges Abroad
CIEE - The Council for International Educational Exchange
EDC Paris Business School, Paris, France
Educational Programmes Abroad, London, United Kingdom
Huron University College, London, Ontario, Canada
International Studies Abroad, Austin, Texas
Tec de Monterrey, San Luis Potosi, Mexico
Kyung Hee University, Seoul, South Korea
Kansai Gaidai University, Osaka, Japan
Lafayette College, Easton, Pennsylvania, United States
Anglo-American University, Prague, Czech Republic
Rutgers University, New Brunswick, New Jersey, United States
San Francisco State University, San Francisco, California, United States
Solvay Business School, Université Libre de Bruxelles, Brussels, Belgium
St. Louis University, St. Louis, Missouri, United States
Universidad de Especialidades Espiritu Santo, Guayaquil, Ecuador
University of Florida, Gainesville, Florida
Universidad de las Americas, Puebla, Mexico
University of Denver, Denver, Colorado

References

External links
Vesalius College Homepage
Online application Vesalius College
 More information about higher education in Flanders/Belgium (in English)
 Find an officially-recognised programme of this institution in the Higher Education Register

Vrije Universiteit Brussel
Universities in Belgium
Universities and colleges in Brussels